Udeme Sam Ekpeyong (born 28 March 1973) is a retired Nigerian sprinter who specialized in the 400 metres.

Ekpeyong won a bronze medal in 4 x 400 metres relay at the 1995 World Championships, together with teammates Kunle Adejuyigbe, Jude Monye and Sunday Bada. At the 1992 Summer Olympics he finished fifth with teammates Emmanuel Okoli, Hassan Bosso and Sunday Bada.

Notes

External links

1973 births
Living people
Nigerian male sprinters
Athletes (track and field) at the 1992 Summer Olympics
Athletes (track and field) at the 1996 Summer Olympics
Olympic athletes of Nigeria
World Athletics Championships medalists
Universiade medalists in athletics (track and field)
Universiade silver medalists for Nigeria
Medalists at the 1995 Summer Universiade
20th-century Nigerian people